

Men's 1 km time trial track cycling events at the 2004 Summer Paralympics were held at the Olympic Velodrome between 18 & 22 September.

There were three classes, for Blind & Visually Impaired, Cerebral Palsy and Locomotor Disability competitors.

B 1-3

The B1-3 event was won by Anthony Biddle and his sighted pilot Kial Stewart, representing .

Results
22 Sept. 2004, 10:50

CP 3/4

The CP Div 3/4 event at the 2004 Summer Paralympics was won by Darren Kenny, representing . Standings were decided by calculated times.

Results
18 Sept. 2004, 15:20

LC 1-4

The LC1-4 event at the 2004 Summer Paralympics was won by Greg Ball, representing . Standings were decided by calculated times.

Results
20 Sept. 2004, 15:20

References

M